Gerd Dvergsdal (born 18 July 1946) is a Norwegian politician for the Centre Party.

She served as a deputy representative to the Norwegian Parliament from Sogn og Fjordane during the term 2001–2005.

On the local level she was mayor of Jølster from 1995 to 2011. She is also a member of the board of the Western Norway Regional Health Authority.

References

1946 births
Living people
Centre Party (Norway) politicians
Deputy members of the Storting
Mayors of places in Sogn og Fjordane
Women mayors of places in Norway
20th-century Norwegian women politicians
20th-century Norwegian politicians
Women members of the Storting